Anke Kühne ( Kühn, born 28 February 1981) is a field hockey player from Germany, who played for the German national team and won the gold medal at the 2004 Summer Olympics in Athens, Greece. She is married to German sculler Tobias Kühne. She has represented Germany in 181 matches.

Kühne began her career with TSV Engensen alongside Kerstin Hoyer, also on the national team, and played there from 1985 to 1991. She went on playing for HC Hannover and remained there from 1991 to 1992. From 1992 to 1997, she played for DTV Hannover. Since 1997, she has been playing for Eintracht Braunschweig in the first and second Bundesliga.

References

External links
 
 
 
 Anke Kühne at NBC Olympics
 Kühn's official site

1981 births
German female field hockey players
Field hockey players at the 2004 Summer Olympics
Field hockey players at the 2008 Summer Olympics
Olympic field hockey players of Germany
Medalists at the 2004 Summer Olympics
Olympic medalists in field hockey
Olympic gold medalists for Germany
Sportspeople from Hanover
Living people